Pavel Demidov may refer to:
 Pavel Nikolaievich Demidov (1798–1840), Russian nobleman
 Pavel Grigoryevich Demidov (1738–1828), Russian traveller and patron of scientific education
 Pavel Pavlovich Demidov, 2nd Prince of San Donato (1839–1885), Russian industrialist, jurist, philanthropist and nobleman
 Pavel Evgenjevič Demidov (1971–2020), Russian caver and speleologist